In Greek mythology, Megareus (Ancient Greek: Μεγαρέας) or Megarus (Μεγαρέως) was king of Onchestus in Boeotia. In some myths, he was the eponymous king of Megara.

Family 
Megareus was either son of Poseidon and Oenope, daughter of Epopeus, or of Onchestus (eponym of their kingdom), or of Apollo or of Aegeus, or of Hippomenes.

Mythology 
Megareus came with his army to the assistance of Nisos, husband of his sister Abrota, against Minos. In one version, he died in the battle, and the city of Nisa (Nisos' domain) was renamed Megara in his honor; in another, he married Iphinoe, daughter of Nisos, and succeeded to his father-in-law's power over Megara. His children by Iphinoe were Evippus, Timalcus, and Evaechme; he also had a son Hippomenes by Merope. With the aid of the god Apollo, Alcathous killed the Cithaeronian lion, for which Megareus gave him his daughter Euaechme as wife. He subsequently made Alcathous his successor, because his own sons did not outlive him: Evippus was killed by the lion, and Timalcus was slain by Theseus, having joined the Dioscuri in the campaign against him.

Notes

Kings in Greek mythology
Children of Poseidon
Demigods in classical mythology

References 

 Gaius Julius Hyginus, Fabulae from The Myths of Hyginus translated and edited by Mary Grant. University of Kansas Publications in Humanistic Studies. Online version at the Topos Text Project.
 Lucius Mestrius Plutarchus, Moralia with an English Translation by Frank Cole Babbitt. Cambridge, MA. Harvard University Press. London. William Heinemann Ltd. 1936. Online version at the Perseus Digital Library. Greek text available from the same website.
 Pausanias, Description of Greece with an English Translation by W.H.S. Jones, Litt.D., and H.A. Ormerod, M.A., in 4 Volumes. Cambridge, MA, Harvard University Press; London, William Heinemann Ltd. 1918. Online version at the Perseus Digital Library
 Pausanias, Graeciae Descriptio. 3 vols. Leipzig, Teubner. 1903.  Greek text available at the Perseus Digital Library.
 Pseudo-Apollodorus, The Library with an English Translation by Sir James George Frazer, F.B.A., F.R.S. in 2 Volumes, Cambridge, MA, Harvard University Press; London, William Heinemann Ltd. 1921. Online version at the Perseus Digital Library. Greek text available from the same website.
 Stephanus of Byzantium, Stephani Byzantii Ethnicorum quae supersunt, edited by August Meineike (1790-1870), published 1849. A few entries from this important ancient handbook of place names have been translated by Brady Kiesling. Online version at the Topos Text Project.

Boeotian characters in Greek mythology
Megarian characters in Greek mythology
Attic mythology